Syaffarizal Mursalin Agri Samara (born August 8, 1992), better known as Farri Agri, is an Indonesian professional footballer who plays as a attacking midfielder for Qatari Second Division club Muaither SC.

Football career
Farri Agri started his career in football at the age of 16 where a bootcamp take place to test young football player who are chosen to be enrolled for Qatar league. Farri has played football at a junior level for Al Khor and was recruited for the Aspire Academy.

Agri was called up to the Indonesian under-23 team in January 2011 for the Olympic qualification matches. However, he did not show up for the training camp. In August 2011, though, Agri said that he wanted to play for Indonesia.

In 2015, he joined Al Ahli. He made his league debut for the club on 27 September 2015.

In 2019, Farri Agri signed a with Liga 1 club Persija Jakarta.

Honours

Clubs honors
Al-Khor
 GCC Champions League runner-up: 2012–13
Al-Mesaimeer
 Qatari Second Division Cup: 2021

Personal life
Agri moved to Al Khor, Qatar with his family aged four, he has been raised in Qatar ever since. He holds a Bachelor of Business Management degree from Stenden University Qatar.

References

External links
 

Living people
1992 births
Acehnese people
Sportspeople from Aceh
Indonesian footballers
Indonesian expatriate footballers
Expatriate footballers in Qatar
Liga 1 (Indonesia) players
Qatar Stars League players
Qatari Second Division players
Al-Khor SC players
Al Ahli SC (Doha) players
Al-Markhiya SC players
Persija Jakarta players
Mesaimeer SC players
Indonesian emigrants to Qatar
Association football forwards
People from Lhokseumawe
Aspire Academy (Qatar) players
Qatari people of Indonesian descent